Ernst Philipp Barthel (17 October 1890 in Schiltigheim – 16 February 1953 in Oberkirch (Baden) was an Alsatian philosopher, mathematician and inventor. In the 1920s and 1930s he taught as a private lecturer of philosophy at the University of Cologne. From 1924 on Barthel edited the magazine Antäus. Blätter für neues Wirklichkeitsdenken (Antaeus. Journal for new Reality Thinking), which served as the organ of the Gesellschaft für Lebensphilosophie (Society for Life Philosophy) founded by him in Cologne. Barthel maintained philosophical friendships with his compatriots Albert Schweitzer and Friedrich Lienhard.

Philosophy and Earth theory
The main principle of Barthel's philosophy on the background of Christian Platonism was the Polarity, which he understood to be the most fundamental, constitutive law in all of nature.
Besides his philosophical work he also published several works on geometry, further developing a non-Euclidean (Riemannian geometry, spherical) theory of geometry, which he called polar geometry. From this geometry he derived a new cosmology with the theory of a Great Earth, which states that the Earth is a maximal sphere in a cyclical space and its surface therefore a total plane, the equator plane of the Cosmos. The (total) plane, as well as the straight line and space as a whole, is flat, without curvature yet closed, running back on itself. Barthel considered this his most important theory, even the most significant thought of the century, as he writes in his autobiography. While some of his academic colleagues stated that this theory is geometrically possible and consistent, others did not acknowledge that and resorted to "the blight of personal calumny", deriding him for allegedly "teaching that the Earth is a disk" or outright declaring him crazy, thus ruining his academic career. In November 1940 he was dismissed from the University of Cologne by the Nazi Reich Minister Rust because of religio-metaphysical (due to his book Der Mensch und die ewigen Hintergründe) and political (alleged Francophilia) suspicions. Ernst Barthel was a member of the National Socialist Teachers League.
The Russian astronomer Leonid Andrenko considered Barthel's main thought among the most ingenious ever suggested and advocated for taking note of it and thinking about it.

Works
Elemente der transzendentalen Logik, Dissertation, Straßburg, 1913
Die Erde als Totalebene. Hyperbolische Raumtheorie mit einer Voruntersuchung über die Kegelschnitte (The Earth as total plane), 1914
Vertikaldimension und Weltraum. Neue Beweise gegen die Kugelgestalt der Erde, 1914
Der Irrtum «g». Ein Traktat über den freien Fall, 1914
Harmonische Astronomie (Harmonical astronomy), 1916
Polargeometrie, 1919
Goethes Wissenschaftslehre in ihrer modernen Tragweite, 1922 
Goethes Relativitätstheorie der Farbe. Nebst einer musikästhetischen Parallele, 1923
Lebensphilosophie, 1923
Philosophie des Eros, 1926
Deutschlands und Europas Schicksalsfrage, in: Zeitschrift für Geopolitik 3 (1926), pp. 303–309.
Form und Seele. Dichtungen, 1927
Die Welt als Spannung und Rhythmus, 1928
Albert Schweitzer as Theologian, in: The Hibbert Journal, XXVI, 4 (1928)
Elsässische Geistesschicksale. Ein Beitrag zur europäischen Verständigung, 1928
Erweiterung raumtheoretischer Denkmöglichkeiten durch die Riemannsche Geometrie, in: Astronomische Nachrichten, Vol. 236 (1929), pp. 139–148.
Goethe, das Sinnbild deutscher Kultur, 1930
Die Monadologie der beiden Welten. Abriß der Metaphysik, Jahrbuch der Elsaß-Lothringischen Wissenschaftlichen Gesellschaft zu Straßburg, Band III, SS. 147–185, 1930
Kosmologische Briefe. Eine neue Lehre vom Weltall (Cosmological letters. A new teaching of the universe), 1931
Vorstellung und Denken. Eine Kritik des pragmatischen Verstandes, 1931
Einführung in die Polargeometrie, (Introduction to Polar Geometry) 2nd ed., 1932
Beiträge zur transzendentalen Logik auf polaristischer Grundlage, 1932
Geometrie und Kosmos, 1939
Die Kosmologie der Großerde im Totalraum, Leipzig: Hillmann 1939
Der Mensch und die ewigen Hintergründe (Man and the eternal background), 1939
 Die Erde als Grundkörper der Welt. Ebertin, Erfurt 1940. According to Barthel's autobiography, p. 231, this book was pulped by the Gestapo in 1941.
Friedrich Lienhard. Die Künstlerseele aus dem deutschen Elsaß, Kolmar im Elsaß, Alsatia Verlag, 1941.
Nietzsche als Verführer (Nietzsche as Seducer), 1947
Mein Opfergang durch diese Zeit. Ein Leben im Kampf um Wahrheit und ein elsässisches Geistesschicksal (My self-sacrifice in these times. A life dedicated to the fight for truth and the fate of an Alsatian mind), Georg Duve (Hrsg.), 2005

Further reading 
Wurtz, Jean-Paul: Ernst Barthel: philosophe alsacien (1890–1953). Recueil d'études publié à l'occasion du centenaire de sa naissance. Strasbourg: Presses Univ. 1991.
Criqui, Fernand: Ein tragisches Elsaesserschicksal: Ernest Barthel. (The tragic fate of an Alsatian: Ernest Barthel), in: Der grosse Straßburger Hinkende Bote, pp. 110–112, 1954

References

External links
 

1890 births
1953 deaths
Alsatian-German people
20th-century German philosophers
20th-century German mathematicians
20th-century German inventors
German male writers